Sonya Harper is a Democratic member of the Illinois House of Representatives. Since her October 20, 2015 appointment to replace the late Esther Golar, she has represented the 6th district, which includes all or portions of Armour Square, Bridgeport, Chicago Lawn, Englewood, Gage Park, McKinley Park, New City and West Englewood in the City of Chicago. Harper is the Joint Chair of the Illinois Legislative Black Caucus.

In 2017, Sonya Harper was named by J.B. Pritzker a member of the Pritzker's Agriculture Transition Committee.

As of July 2, 2022, Representative Harper is a member of the following Illinois House Committees:

 (Chairwoman of) Agriculture & Conservation Committee (HAGC)
 Appropriations - Public Safety Committee (HAPP)
 Economic Opportunity & Equity Committee (HECO)
 Elementary & Secondary Education: School Curriculum & Policies Committee (HELM)
 Energy & Environment Committee (HENG)
 Health Care Availability & Access Committee (HHCA)
 Revenue & Finance Committee (HREF)
 Sales, Amusement, & Other Taxes Subcommittee (HREF-SATX)

Electoral history

References

External links 
Representative Sonya M. Harper (D) at the Illinois General Assembly
By session: 100th, 99th
Rep Harper District Website Rep Sonya Harper District Website

Living people
Politicians from Chicago
University of Missouri alumni
Democratic Party members of the Illinois House of Representatives
Women state legislators in Illinois
Year of birth missing (living people)
African-American state legislators in Illinois
African-American women in politics
21st-century American politicians
21st-century American women politicians
21st-century African-American women
21st-century African-American politicians